Jörg Stratmann (born 7 April 1954) is a German fencer. He competed in the individual and team sabre events at the 1984 Summer Olympics.

References

External links
 

1954 births
Living people
German male fencers
Olympic fencers of West Germany
Fencers at the 1984 Summer Olympics